Ray Schow is an American politician who served as a member of the Washington State Senate, representing the 30th district from 1994 to 1999. A member of the Republican Party, he was appointed to fill the vacancy created by Pete von Reichbauer's resignation to become a member of the King County Council in January 1994 and was defeated by Democrat Tracey Eide in 1998.

References 

Living people
People from Federal Way, Washington
Republican Party Washington (state) state senators
20th-century American politicians
Year of birth missing (living people)